Werk-en-rust, also Werken-Rust, (Work and Rest) is a ward in Georgetown, Guyana, located along the Demerara River that feeds into the Atlantic Ocean.

History
It began as a plantation, and by the end of the 18th century, its size was reduced as parcels of land were sold off to saw-millers. In 1798, it was a coffee plantation owned by Erve Weber & Co. A cemetery was established there, people began to settle in Werk-en-rust, and it became an extension of Stabroek by 1799.
It is located south of Stabroek, which began as a two-mile brick road with a row of houses on each side of the road. By 1812, Werk-en-rust was one of eight wards of a city called Germantown. The other wards were Charles Town, Cumingsburg, Kingston, Lacy Town, New Town, and Robb Town. The wards were created from the Eve Leary, Le Repentir, La Bourgade, and Vlissengen, and Werk-en-Rust plantations. 

In 1817, there were 49 female and 56 male enslaved people and was owned by the estate of a person whose name may be Ern Weeber. The estate was owned by H.J. C. Neuwieller in 1826. Richard Michael Jones owned the plantation by 1832. In 1832 and 1833, Werk-en-Rust was a coffee and plantain plantation with 35 male and 28 female slaves. At some point, it was a sugar plantation. By 1911, Werk-en-Rust was populated by Afro-Guyanese, Portuguese and Chinese citizens.

References

Wards of Georgetown, Guyana
History of Guyana